Francis Celeste Le Blond (February 14, 1821 – November 9, 1902) was an American lawyer and politician who served two terms as a Democratic member of the U.S. House of Representatives from Ohio from 1863 to 1867.

Biography 
Francis Celeste Le Blond (grandfather of Frank Le Blond Kloeb) was born in Bellville, Ohio.  He was admitted to the bar in 1844 and commenced practice in Celina, Ohio. He was a member of the Ohio House of Representatives from 1851 to 1855. He served as speaker of the house in 1854 and 1855.

Congress 
Le Blond was elected as a Democrat to the Thirty-eighth and Thirty-ninth Congresses.  He declined to be a candidate for renomination in 1866.

Later career and death 
He resumed the practice of law and also engaged in business, and died in Celina, Ohio, on November 9, 1902. Interment in North Grove Cemetery.

Sources

The Political Graveyard

1821 births
1902 deaths
Speakers of the Ohio House of Representatives
Ohio lawyers
People from Bellville, Ohio
People from Celina, Ohio
19th-century American politicians
Democratic Party members of the Ohio House of Representatives
Democratic Party members of the United States House of Representatives from Ohio